The 1972–73 season was Paris Saint-Germain's 3rd season in existence. PSG played their home league games at the Stade Municipal Georges Lefèvre in Saint-Germain-en-Laye, registering an average attendance of 679 spectators per match. The club was presided by Henri Patrelle and the team was managed by Robert Vicot. Camille Choquier was the team captain.

Summary

Bound by professional contracts with Paris FC, most of the club's players, including team captain Jean Djorkaeff and Bernard Guignedoux, continued playing in Division 1, while manager Pierre Phelipon departed following the expiration of his contract. Only Camille Choquier, Patrice Py, Jean-Louis Leonetti, Bernard Béréau and Jean-Louis Brost stayed with PSG in 1972–73. The club took the spot of its reserve team in Division 3 and rebuilt their squad with many upcoming players from the Paris Saint-Germain Academy.

Led by new manager Robert Vicot, Paris Saint-Germain began life in the third tier with a young but talented squad that would star in the club's forthcoming back-to-back promotions. Some of these gifted youngsters included Éric Renaut, Othniel Dossevi, Michel Marella, Jacques Laposte and, most notably, Christian André, the main architect of the rise to Division 2 thanks to his 27 goals in 35 games. The Red and Blues finished second in Group West, six points behind Quevilly, missing out on promotion by little. Quevilly, however, had to dissolve due to financial problems shortly after the end of the season and PSG took their place in Division 2 by default.

Players

As of the 1972–73 season.

Squad

Transfers

As of the 1972–73 season.

Arrivals

Departures

Kits

Canadian grocery store chain Montreal was the shirt sponsor. French sportswear brand Le Coq Sportif was the kit manufacturer.

Competitions

Overview

Division 3

League table (Group West)

Results by round

Matches

Coupe de France

Preliminary rounds

Round of 64

Statistics

As of the 1972–73 season.

Appearances and goals

|-
!colspan="16" style="background:#dcdcdc; text-align:center"|Goalkeepers

|-
!colspan="16" style="background:#dcdcdc; text-align:center"|Defenders

|-
!colspan="16" style="background:#dcdcdc; text-align:center"|Midfielders

|-
!colspan="16" style="background:#dcdcdc; text-align:center"|Forwards

|-

References

External links

Official websites
PSG.FR - Site officiel du Paris Saint-Germain
Paris Saint-Germain - Ligue 1 
Paris Saint-Germain - UEFA.com

Paris Saint-Germain F.C. seasons
Association football clubs 1972–73 season
French football clubs 1972–73 season